Carles Busquets Barroso (born 19 July 1967) is a Spanish former professional footballer who played as a goalkeeper, mostly for Barcelona.

Club career
Born in Barcelona, Catalonia, Busquets was a FC Barcelona graduate who joined from neighbouring CD Ciutat Badia and possessed very good technical skills for a player in his position, and he made his La Liga debut for the first team on 7 November 1993 in a 2–1 home win over Racing de Santander, going on to appear in the following two games. However, he was mostly back-up for Spanish international Andoni Zubizarreta during his first years; he did manage to feature in the 1990–91 European Cup Winners' Cup final in a 1–2 loss against Manchester United, with two goals from Mark Hughes.

Busquets totalled 69 league matches in two seasons after Zubizarreta left for Valencia CF, and was also on goal in the 4–0 thrashing of Manchester United in the group stage of 1994–95's UEFA Champions League, but during this period Barça failed to win any silverware. The following campaigns he was again second choice, first to Portugal's Vítor Baía then Dutchman Ruud Hesp, and also clashed with new manager Louis van Gaal.

Until his retirement in October 2002, Busquets played a further four seasons with neighbouring UE Lleida, spending two apiece in Segunda División and Segunda División B. He joined Barcelona's coaching staff afterwards, and worked with the goalkeepers.

Playing style
Originally a forward at the start of his career until he had to replace an injured goalkeeper, Busquets notably excelled in footplay. Branded by French newspaper L'Équipe as the goalkeeper with no hands, he has been considered a forefather of this type of play. His style was dismissed by some as less suitable for football than for handball.

Busquets' reputation of being nearly unbeatable in these situations tended to be overshadowed by his occasional baffling blunders. However, he was able to keep the number of goals he conceded below the number of games he played in 1995–96, his final season as Barcelona's first choice, and retrospectively Johan Cruyff considered him one of the club's most secure goalkeepers in the modern era.

Busquets wore tracksuit trousers instead of shorts while playing, even during hot weather. This piqued the attention of the public to the extent that some fans speculated that he was trying to hide a scar, burn or tattoo. He explained that after getting used to wear them in training he decided to use them in matches as well, as he felt safer from knee injuries that way.

Personal life
Busquets' son, Sergio, also a product of Barcelona's youth system, was promoted to the main squad for 2008–09, playing as a defensive midfielder. He reached the national team the following year, winning the 2010 FIFA World Cup in South Africa as a starter.

Honours
Barcelona
La Liga: 1993–94, 1997–98
Copa del Rey: 1996–97
Supercopa de España: 1991, 1992, 1994, 1996
European Cup: 1991–92; Runner-up 1993–94
UEFA Cup Winners' Cup: 1996–97; Runner-up 1990–91
UEFA Super Cup: 1992, 1997

References

External links

1967 births
Living people
Footballers from Barcelona
Spanish footballers
Association football goalkeepers
La Liga players
Segunda División players
Segunda División B players
Tercera División players
FC Barcelona C players
FC Barcelona Atlètic players
FC Barcelona players
UE Lleida players
Spain youth international footballers
Catalonia international footballers
FC Barcelona non-playing staff